Nataly is a female given name, a variant form of Natalie (given name).

People with the given name Nataly
Nataly Andria, Nataly Laingo Haritiana Andrianaivoson, Malagasy singer-songwriter
Nataly Dawn, performing name of Natalie Dawn Knutsen, American vocalist with Pomplamoose
Hamy Nataly Tejeda Funes (born 1984),  Guatemalan beauty queen

Fictional characters
Nataly, a character in the video game Suikoden IV
Nataly Jäger, wife of Jo Gerner in the long-running German soap opera Gute Zeiten, schlechte Zeiten

See also
Natalee
Natalia (given name)
Natalie (given name)
Nathalie
Natasha
Natty (disambiguation)
La fiera, 1983 Mexican telenovela also known as Nataly

Feminine given names